This is a list of Olof Palme memorials: places named in honor of Olof Palme, the assassinated Prime Minister of Sweden.

 The Olof Palme Memorial Fund for International Understanding and Common Security was established by Olof Palme's family and by the Social Democratic Party to honour his memory.

See also 
 List of streets named after Olof Palme
 Tunnelgatan

References 

Lists of buildings and structures in Sweden
Palme, Olof
Olof Palme